A total solar eclipse occurred on January 25, 1944. A solar eclipse occurs when the Moon passes between Earth and the Sun, thereby totally or partly obscuring the image of the Sun for a viewer on Earth. A total solar eclipse occurs when the Moon's apparent diameter is larger than the Sun's, blocking all direct sunlight, turning day into darkness. Totality occurs in a narrow path across Earth's surface, with the partial solar eclipse visible over a surrounding region thousands of kilometres wide. Totality was visible from Peru, Brazil, British Sierra Leone (today's Sierra Leone), and French West Africa (the parts now belonging to Guinea, Mali, Burkina Faso and Niger, including Guinean capital Conakry). At greatest eclipse, the Sun was 78 degrees above horizon (just 12 degrees from zenith).

Related eclipses

Solar eclipses 1942–1946

Saros 130

Metonic series

Notes

References

1944 01 25
1944 in science
1944 01 25
January 1944 events